Louis Mermaz (born 20 August 1931 in Paris) is a French politician.

Early life 
He became an ally of François Mitterrand in the late 1950s and in 1971 became a member of Mitterrand's staff in the French Socialist Party. In 1967, he was elected Deputy of Isère for the first time.

In 1981, he was appointed Minister of Transport in the first government of socialist Pierre Mauroy, before his election to Presidency of the National Assembly. He served in this office to 1986. He served as Minister of Agriculture from 1990 to 1992, and Minister of Relations with Parliament in the Bérégovoy government from 1992 to 1993. He is also Government's spokesperson in the same cabinet.

From 2001 to 2011, he was senator of Isère.

References

1931 births
Living people
Politicians from Paris
Democratic and Socialist Union of the Resistance politicians
Convention of Republican Institutions politicians
Socialist Party (France) politicians
Transport ministers of France
Government spokespersons of France
French Ministers of Agriculture
Presidents of the National Assembly (France)
Deputies of the 3rd National Assembly of the French Fifth Republic
Deputies of the 5th National Assembly of the French Fifth Republic
Deputies of the 6th National Assembly of the French Fifth Republic
Deputies of the 7th National Assembly of the French Fifth Republic
Deputies of the 8th National Assembly of the French Fifth Republic
Deputies of the 9th National Assembly of the French Fifth Republic
Deputies of the 11th National Assembly of the French Fifth Republic
French Senators of the Fifth Republic
Senators of Isère